The lateral talocalcaneal ligament (external calcaneo-astragaloid ligament) is a ligament in the ankle. It is a short, strong fasciculus, passing from the lateral surface of the talus, immediately beneath its fibular facet to the lateral surface of the calcaneus.

It is placed in front of, but on a deeper plane than, the calcaneofibular ligament, with the fibers of which it is parallel.

References

Ligaments of the lower limb